Switzerland competed at the 1928 Summer Olympics in Amsterdam, Netherlands. 133 competitors, 132 men and 1 woman, took part in 70 events in 15 sports.

Medalists

Athletics

Cycling

Nine cyclists, all men, represented Switzerland in 1928.

Individual road race
 Gottlieb Amstein
 Jakob Caironi
 Türel Wanzenried
 Paul Litschi

Team road race
 Gottlieb Amstein
 Jakob Caironi
 Türel Wanzenried

Sprint
 Willi Knabenhans

Time trial
 Erich Fäs

Team pursuit
 Erich Fäs
 Gustave Moos
 Heinz Gilgen
 Joseph Fischler

Diving

Equestrian

Fencing

Nine fencers, eight men and 1 woman, represented Switzerland in 1928.

Men's foil
 Eugène Empeyta
 Frédéric Fitting
 John Albaret

Men's team foil
 Édouard Fitting, Frédéric Fitting, Eugène Empeyta, John Albaret, Michel Fauconnet, Jean de Bardel

Men's épée
 Eugène Empeyta
 Henri Jacquet
 Édouard Fitting

Men's team épée
 Édouard Fitting, Henri Jacquet, Frédéric Fitting, Eugène Empeyta, John Albaret, Paul de Graffenried

Women's foil
 Jeanne Morgenthaler

Football

Round of 16

Gymnastics

Hockey

Roster

 Group play

Rowing

Sailing

Swimming

Water Polo

Weightlifting

Wrestling

Art competitions

References

External links
Official Olympic Reports
International Olympic Committee results database

Nations at the 1928 Summer Olympics
1928
1928 in Swiss sport